The Denver Pioneers women's basketball team represents the University of Denver and competes in the NCAA Division I women's college basketball in Denver, Colorado.

History
Denver began play in 1974, after a few years playing as a club sport. They played in the Intermountain Conference from 1974–1978, the Continental Divide/Colorado Athletic from 1978–1996, and the Rocky Mountain from 1996–98 before joining Division I play in 1998. In the 2000–01 season, the Pioneers won 24 games and went 14–2 to win the West Division in the conference. In the Sun Belt Conference championship game, they lost 67–55 to Louisiana Tech. Despite the loss, they were invited to the NCAA Division I Tournament for the first time in school history. In the First Round, they were beaten 77–57 by Virginia Tech. Denver has made two appearances in the WNIT, in 2011 and 2019. They lost 75–60 to BYU in the First Round in 2011 and beat the University of New Mexico 83–75 in the First Round in 2019. Then went on to lose to the University of Idaho 66–88 in the Second Round in 2019. The Pioneers played in the Western Athletic Conference for 2012–13 before joining the Summit League in 2013. As of the end of the 2015–16 season, the Pioneers have an all-time record of 637–549.

Postseason

NCAA Division I tournament results
The Pioneers have made one appearance in the NCAA Division I women's basketball tournament. They have a combined record of 0–1.

NCAA Division II tournament results
The Pioneers made two appearances in the NCAA Division II women's basketball tournament. They had a combined record of 0–2.

References

External links